Cosmardia moritzella is a moth of the family Gelechiidae. It is found in Portugal, France, Germany, Austria, Switzerland, Italy, Poland, the Czech Republic, Slovakia, Belarus, Hungary, Romania, Greece, Estonia, Latvia, Lithuania, Finland, Norway, Ukraine and Russia (Ural Mountains, Altai Mountains and south-western Siberia).

The wingspan is 13–14 mm.

The larvae feed on Silene latifolia and Silene dioica.

References

Moths described in 1835
Gnorimoschemini
Moths of Europe